Heterogeneous System Architecture (HSA) is a cross-vendor set of specifications that allow for the integration of central processing units and graphics processors on the same bus, with shared memory and tasks. The HSA is being developed by the HSA Foundation, which includes (among many others) AMD and ARM. The platform's stated aim is to reduce communication latency between CPUs, GPUs and other compute devices, and make these various devices more compatible from a programmer's perspective, relieving the programmer of the task of planning the moving of data between devices' disjoint memories (as must currently be done with OpenCL or CUDA).

CUDA and OpenCL as well as most other fairly advanced programming languages can use HSA to increase their execution performance.  Heterogeneous computing is widely used in system-on-chip devices such as tablets, smartphones, other mobile devices, and video game consoles. HSA allows programs to use the graphics processor for floating point calculations without separate memory or scheduling.

Rationale
The rationale behind HSA is to ease the burden on programmers when offloading calculations to the GPU. Originally driven solely by AMD and called the FSA, the idea was extended to encompass processing units other than GPUs, such as other manufacturers' DSPs, as well.

Modern GPUs are very well suited to perform single instruction, multiple data (SIMD) and single instruction, multiple threads (SIMT), while modern CPUs are still being optimized for branching. etc.

Overview

Originally introduced by embedded systems such as the Cell Broadband Engine, sharing system memory directly between multiple system actors makes heterogeneous computing more mainstream. Heterogeneous computing itself refers to systems that contain multiple processing units central processing units (CPUs), graphics processing units (GPUs), digital signal processors (DSPs), or any type of application-specific integrated circuits (ASICs). The system architecture allows any accelerator, for instance a graphics processor, to operate at the same processing level as the system's CPU.

Among its main features, HSA defines a unified virtual address space for compute devices: where GPUs traditionally have their own memory, separate from the main (CPU) memory, HSA requires these devices to share page tables so that devices can exchange data by sharing pointers. This is to be supported by custom memory management units.  To render interoperability possible and also to ease various aspects of programming, HSA is intended to be ISA-agnostic for both CPUs and accelerators, and to support high-level programming languages.

So far, the HSA specifications cover:

HSA Intermediate Layer
HSAIL (Heterogeneous System Architecture Intermediate Language), a virtual instruction set for parallel programs
 similar to LLVM Intermediate Representation and SPIR (used by OpenCL and Vulkan)
 finalized to a specific instruction set by a JIT compiler
 make late decisions on which core(s) should run a task
 explicitly parallel
 supports exceptions, virtual functions and other high-level features
 debugging support

HSA memory model
 compatible with C++11, OpenCL, Java and .NET memory models
 relaxed consistency
 designed to support both managed languages (e.g. Java) and unmanaged languages (e.g. C)
 will make it much easier to develop 3rd-party compilers for a wide range of heterogeneous products programmed in Fortran, C++, C++ AMP, Java, et al.

HSA dispatcher and run-time
 designed to enable heterogeneous task queueing: a work queue per core, distribution of work into queues, load balancing by work stealing
 any core can schedule work for any other, including itself
 significant reduction of overhead of scheduling work for a core

Mobile devices are one of the HSA's application areas, in which it yields improved power efficiency.

Block diagrams
The illustrations below compare CPU-GPU coordination under HSA versus under traditional architectures.

Software support

Some of the HSA-specific features implemented in the hardware need to be supported by the operating system kernel and specific device drivers. For example, support for AMD Radeon and AMD FirePro graphics cards, and APUs based on Graphics Core Next (GCN), was merged into version 3.19 of the Linux kernel mainline, released on 8 February 2015.

Additionally,  supports heterogeneous queuing (HQ), which aims to simplify the distribution of computational jobs among multiple CPUs and GPUs from the programmer's perspective. Support for heterogeneous memory management (HMM), suited only for graphics hardware featuring version 2 of the AMD's IOMMU, was accepted into the Linux kernel mainline version 4.14.

Integrated support for HSA platforms has been announced for the "Sumatra" release of OpenJDK, due in 2015.

AMD APP SDK is AMD's proprietary software development kit targeting parallel computing, available for Microsoft Windows and Linux.  Bolt is a C++ template library optimized for heterogeneous computing.

GPUOpen comprehends a couple of other software tools related to HSA. CodeXL version 2.0 includes an HSA profiler.

Hardware support

AMD
, only AMD's "Kaveri" A-series APUs (cf. "Kaveri" desktop processors and "Kaveri" mobile processors) and Sony's PlayStation 4 allowed the integrated GPU to access memory via version 2 of the AMD's IOMMU. Earlier APUs (Trinity and Richland) included the version 2 IOMMU functionality, but only for use by an external GPU connected via PCI Express.

Post-2015 Carrizo and Bristol Ridge APUs also include the version 2 IOMMU functionality for the integrated GPU.

ARM
ARM's Bifrost microarchitecture, as implemented in the Mali-G71, is fully compliant with the HSA 1.1 hardware specifications. , ARM has not announced software support that would use this hardware feature.

See also
 General-purpose computing on graphics processing units (GPGPU)
 Non-Uniform Memory Access (NUMA)
 OpenMP
 Shared memory
 Zero-copy

References

External links

  by Vinod Tipparaju at SC13 in November 2013
 HSA and the software ecosystem
 2012 – HSA by Michael Houston

 
Heterogeneous computing